One of the Guys is a Canadian documentary film, directed by Doris Buttignol and released in 2018. The film profiles Vincent Lamarre, a trans man who was one of the first transgender soldiers ever to come out and begin gender transition while actively serving in the Canadian Forces.

The film received selected film festival screenings in Canada, including at the Cinéfest Sudbury International Film Festival, but was distributed primarily as an episode of the Ici RDI documentary series Les Grands Reportages.

References

External links

2018 films
Canadian documentary films
Canadian LGBT-related films
Transgender-related documentary films
2018 LGBT-related films
Films about trans men
French-language Canadian films
2010s Canadian films